Elongatocontoderus fuscofasciatus is a species of beetle in the family Cerambycidae, and the only species in the genus Elongatocontoderus. It was described by Breuning in 1977.

Description
The setae is adpressed and short. Prothorax is transverse

References

Acanthocinini
Beetles described in 1977
Beetles of Australia
Monotypic Cerambycidae genera
Taxa named by Stephan von Breuning (entomologist)